Princess Sharifa Ismail (1 January 1942 - 20 June 1964) was a member of Maldivian Royal Family. She was the eldest daughter of Prince Ismail Ali (Kokkoge Ismail) and Princess Aiminath Mohamed Didi (kaanlo) Both descendants of Dhiyamigili Dynasty.

Family
Princess Sharifa married to Sheikh Ibrahim Hassan in 1954 and had four children:
Princess Fathimath Raziyya (1955-1955)
Princess Aiminath Rahma    (1957-
Princess Aishath Rameeza   (1961-
Princess Maryam Masroora   (1964-

Death
Princess Sharifa died after giving birth to Princess Masroora on June 20, 1964. She is buried in Maafanu cemetery.

References 

1942 births
1964 deaths
Maldivian nobility